is a 1957 color Japanese film directed by Yasushi Sasaki.

It is the 22nd film in the Hatamoto Taikutsuotoko (旗本退屈男) series.

Cast 
 Saotome Mondosuke: Utaemon Ichikawa
 Kirishima Kyōya: Kin'ya Kitaōji
 Saotome Kikuji: Akiko Santo
 Sasao Kinai: Shunji Sakai

References

1957 films
Jidaigeki films
Samurai films
Films directed by Yasushi Sasaki
Toei Company films
1950s Japanese films